Daniel López Nelio Santiago (10 April 1949 – 8 June 2004) was a Mexican politician affiliated with the Party of the Democratic Revolution. He served as Senator of the LVIII and briefly during the LIX Legislature of the Mexican Congress representing Oaxaca and as Deputy of the LIV Legislature.

References

1949 births
2004 deaths
Politicians from Oaxaca
Members of the Senate of the Republic (Mexico)
Members of the Chamber of Deputies (Mexico)
Party of the Democratic Revolution politicians
21st-century Mexican politicians
People from Juchitán de Zaragoza
National Autonomous University of Mexico alumni